Lycochloa is a genus of Lebanese plants in the grass family. The only known species is Lycochloa avenacea, found only in Lebanon.

References

Pooideae
Monotypic Poaceae genera
Endemic flora of Lebanon